Pale rasbora (Rasbora aurotaenia) is a species of ray-finned fish in the genus Rasbora. It is known from the Chao Phraya and Mekong basins as well as from the Maeklong River in Southeast Asia. It can grow to  SL.

Description 
This fish lives near the surface of ponds, lakes, canals and rivers. Usually found in turbid waters. The main food is probably exogenous insects and some algae. They lay eggs in ponds and rivers during the rainy season.

Perfect side line; pale with a neon green stripe running above the dark lateral midline stripe when alive. Dorsal fin base is closer to the caudal fin base than eye; caudal fin bright yellow, with black posterior margin.

Human uses 
Not of great commercial value. Sometimes sold as fresh fish, but also used as beef sauce in Khmer cuisine in Cambodia and southern Vietnam .

References 

Rasboras
Fish of the Mekong Basin
Fish of Cambodia
Fish of Laos
Freshwater fish of Malaysia
Fish of Thailand
Fish of Vietnam
Fish described in 1885
Taxa named by Gilbert Tirant